is a 2014 Japanese school horror film written and directed by Masayuki Ochiai and based on Gakkō no Kaidan. The main cast includes the five members of the Japanese idol girl group Tokyo Girls' Style. The film was released on May 23, 2014.

Cast

Kouhei Takeda

Music
The theme song is by Tokyo Girls' Style.

See also
School Ghost Stories

References

External links
 

Gakkō no Kaidan
2010s Japanese films
2014 horror films
Films directed by Masayuki Ochiai
Japanese high school films
Japanese horror films
2010s high school films